Michael McGrath may refer to:

Public officials
Michael McGrath (American politician) (born 1942), Minnesota State Treasurer
Mike McGrath, American jurist; Montana Supreme Court chief justice since 2009
Michael McGrath (Irish politician) (born 1976), Fianna Fáil member of Dáil Éireann

Sportspeople
Mike McGrath, American bowler in PBA Bowling Tour: 1969 Season
Michael McGrath (hurler) (born 1963), Irish right wing-forward 
Mike McGrath, American coach in 2019 for Chicago Maroons men's basketball
Mick McGrath (footballer) (born 1936), Irish former footballer
Mick McGrath (athlete) (born 1947), Australian former triple jumper
Mick McGrath (rugby union) (born 1991), Irish rugby player

Others
Michael McGrath (bishop) (1882–1961), Irish-born Welsh Roman Catholic prelate
Michael McGrath (actor) (born 1957), American performer in Broadway musicals

See also
Michael MacGrath, Irish judge